Posai Sitiboonlert; is a Thai Muay Thai fighter who competed in the 1970s.

Biography and career
Prayong Makkong started Muay Thai at the age of 13 at the Kor Srimongkon Gym where he took the name "Posai Saktuanchai". Posai trained for three years before he started competing and won his first 20 fights, fighting in the provinces of Lopburi, Nakhon Sawan and Chainat. Based on this success he was brought to the Sitiboonlert gym.

Posai reached his peak in the second half of the 1970s, being considered as an elite fighter from 1975 as he went undefeated during that year.
The apex of his career being the year 1977 where his domination led to the organisation of handicap fights where he had to take on multiple fighters in one night without a break. The first time in Lumpinee Stadium against Jocky Sitkanpai and Jitti Muangkhonkaen who he defeated by decision. Later that year Posai faced three Japanese fighters in a row defeating all of them including one by kncokout. 1977 is also the year he defeated muay thai legend Poot Lorlek and received the King's Fighter of the Year award for doing so. During his best years as a competitor Posai scored wins over other notable fighters such as Neth Saknarong, Wichit Lookbangplasoy, or Sagat Petchyindee. 
The end of Posai's days as part of the stadium elite came in late 1979 when he suffered back to back losses, first by decision to the other ultra dominant knee fighter of the circuit Dieselnoi Chor Thanasukarn.<ref>{{cite web |title=ขุนเข่าทะลุฟ้าดีเซลน้อย ช.ธนสุกาญจน์...อดีตแชมป์รุ่นไลต์เวตเวทีลุมพินี |url=https://www.siamsport.co.th/boxing/thaiboxing/view/176627 |website=siamsport.co.th |date=29 February 2020 |access-date=9 January 2022}}</ref> His second and more devastating loss was inflicted by Padejsuk Pitsanurachan who knocked him out in the fourth round, marking the first loss by finish in five years for Posai. He would come back the next year and win two fights before being stopped by Youssop Sor.Thanikul in a bout where the referee asked him to leave the ring as he was not displaying any sort of fighting spirit. He retired following this loss. Posai is one of the most dominant Thai fighters to never win a stadium title.

Titles and accomplishments
 1976 Fighter of the Year

Muay Thai record

|-  style="background:#fbb;"
| 1981- || Loss||align=left| Payap Premchai||  || Phrae province, Thailand || || ||

|-  style="background:#fbb;"
| 1980-08-08 || Loss ||align=left| Yousop Sor.Thanikul || || Bangkok, Thailand || Referee Stoppage|| 5 ||

|-  style="background:#cfc;"
| 1980- || Win ||align=left| Seksan Sor.Theppitak|| || Bangkok, Thailand || Decision || 5 || 3:00

|-  style="background:#cfc;"
| 1980- || Win ||align=left| Khaosod Sitphraprom || || Bangkok, Thailand || Decision || 5 || 3:00

|-  style="background:#fbb;"
| 1979-12-07 || Loss||align=left| Padejsuk Pitsanurachan|| Lumpinee Stadium || Bangkok, Thailand || TKO (Punches) || 4 ||

|-  style="background:#fbb;"
| 1979-10-09 || Loss||align=left| Dieselnoi Chor Thanasukarn || Lumpinee Stadium || Bangkok, Thailand || Decision || 5 || 3:00

|-  style="background:#cfc;"
| 1979-05-25|| Win ||align=left| Jitti Muangkhonkaen ||  || Bangkok, Thailand || Decision ||5 ||3:00

|-  style="background:#cfc;"
| 1979-04-03 || Win ||align=left| Sagat Petchyindee || || Bangkok, Thailand || Decision || 5 || 3:00

|-  style="background:#fbb;"
| 1979-03-03 || Loss ||align=left| Vicharnnoi Porntawee || Lumpinee Stadium || Bangkok, Thailand || Decision || 5 || 3:00

|-  style="background:#cfc;"
| 1978-12-05 || Win ||align=left| Pongdejnoi Prasopchai ||  || Bangkok, Thailand || Decision || 5 || 3:00

|-  style="background:#cfc;"
| 1978-11-06 || Win ||align=left| Neuasila Nor.Bangkod || Lumpinee Stadium || Bangkok, Thailand || Decision || 5 || 3:00

|-  style="background:#cfc;"
| 1978-09-15 || Win ||align=left| Siprae Kiatsompop || Lumpinee Stadium || Bangkok, Thailand || Decision || 5 || 3:00

|-  style="background:#cfc;"
| 1978-08-18 || Win ||align=left| Ron Kuyt|| Lumpinee Stadium || Bangkok, Thailand || KO (Knees)|| 2 ||

|-  style="background:#fbb;"
| 1978-05-04 || Loss ||align=left| Vicharnnoi Porntawee || Rajadamnern Stadium || Bangkok, Thailand || Decision || 5 || 3:00

|-  style="background:#cfc;"
| 1978-02-24 || Win ||align=left| Seinong Sitbangprachan || Lumpinee Stadium || Bangkok, Thailand || Decision || 5 || 3:00

|-  style="background:#cfc;"
| 1978-01-27 || Win ||align=left| Wichit Lookbangplasoy || Lumpinee Stadium || Bangkok, Thailand || Decision || 5 || 3:00

|-  style="background:#cfc;"
| 1977-11-05 ||Win ||align=left| Poot Lorlek || || Hat Yai, Thailand || Referee stoppage || 5 ||

|-  style="background:#fbb;"
| 1977-05-27 || Loss ||align=left| Jitti Muangkhonkaen || Lumpinee Stadium || Bangkok, Thailand || Referee stoppage || 4 ||
|-
! style=background:white colspan=9 |

|-  style="background:#cfc;"
| 1977-04-08 || Win||align=left|    || 3 vs 1 Lumpinee Stadium  || Bangkok, Thailand || KO (Knee) DecisionDecision  || 22 || 3:003:00

|-  style="background:#cfc;"
| 1977-03-11 || Win ||align=left| Poot Lorlek || Lumpinee Stadium || Bangkok, Thailand || Decision || 5 || 3:00
|-
! style=background:white colspan=9 |

|-  style="background:#cfc;"
| 1977-02-04 || Win||align=left| Jocky Sitkanpai Jitti Muangkhonkaen || 2 vs 1 Lumpinee Stadium  || Bangkok, Thailand || Decision  || 6 || 3:00
|-
! style=background:white colspan=9 |

|-  style="background:#cfc;"
| 1976-11-03 || Win ||align=left| Jitti Muangkhonkaen ||Lumpinee Stadium || Bangkok, Thailand || Decision || 5 || 3:00

|-  style="background:#cfc;"
| 1976-10-05 || Win ||align=left| Neth Saknarong || Lumpinee Stadium || Bangkok, Thailand || Decision || 5 || 3:00

|-  style="background:#c5d2ea;"
| 1976-08-31 || Draw||align=left| Neth Saknarong || Lumpinee Stadium || Bangkok, Thailand || Decision || 5 || 3:00

|-  style="background:#fbb;"
| 1976-07-15 || Loss ||align=left| Vicharnnoi Porntawee ||Rajadamnern Stadium || Bangkok, Thailand || Decision || 5 || 3:00
|-
! style=background:white colspan=9 |

|-  style="background:#c5d2ea;"
| 1976-05-14 || NC||align=left| Wichit Lookbangplasoy || Lumpinee Stadium || Bangkok, Thailand || Referee Stoppage|| 5 || 
|-
! style=background:white colspan=9 |

|-  style="background:#cfc;"
| 1976-03-02 || Win ||align=left| Chalermphon Sor Tha-it || Lumpinee Stadium || Bangkok, Thailand || Decision || 5 || 3:00

|-  style="background:#fbb;"
| 1976-01-20 || Loss ||align=left| Neth Saknarong || Lumpinee Stadium || Bangkok, Thailand || Decision || 5 || 3:00

|-  style="background:#cfc;"
| 1975-12-23 || Win ||align=left| Weerachat Sorndaeng || Lumpinee Stadium || Bangkok, Thailand || Decision || 5 || 3:00

|-  style="background:#cfc;"
| 1975-10-14 || Win ||align=left| Siprae Duangprateep || Lumpinee Stadium || Bangkok, Thailand || KO || 3 ||

|-  style="background:#cfc;"
| 1975-09-12 || Win ||align=left| Chartrung Rojanasongkram || Lumpinee Stadium || Bangkok, Thailand || Decision || 5 || 3:00

|-  style="background:#cfc;"
| 1975-07-08 || Win ||align=left| Permsiri Rungrit || Lumpinee Stadium || Bangkok, Thailand || Decision || 5 || 3:00

|-  style="background:#cfc;"
| 1975-06-06 || Win ||align=left| Saifah Saengmorakot || Lumpinee Stadium || Bangkok, Thailand || KO || 2 ||

|-  style="background:#cfc;"
| 1975-05-09 || Win ||align=left| Kuekkong Chor. Suthichot ||  || Bangkok, Thailand || KO || 1 ||

|-  style="background:#cfc;"
| 1975-03-25 || Win ||align=left| Kraipetch Sor. Prateep ||  || Bangkok, Thailand || Decision || 5 || 3:00

|-  style="background:#cfc;"
| 1975-02-14 || Win ||align=left| Somsak Sor.Thewasoonthorn ||  || Bangkok, Thailand || Disqualification|| 5 ||

|-  style="background:#cfc;"
| 1975-01-14 || Win ||align=left| Faprakrob Singsamliam || Lumpinee Stadium || Bangkok, Thailand || KO || 3 ||

|-  style="background:#fbb;"
| 1974-12-19 || Loss ||align=left| Srinakorn Singbonkai || Lumpinee Stadium || Bangkok, Thailand || KO (Punches)|| 2 ||

|-  style="background:#cfc;"
| 1974-04-23 || Win ||align=left| Sommai Ekayothin || Lumpinee Stadium || Bangkok, Thailand || Decision || 5 ||3:00
|-
| colspan=9 | Legend'':

See more
List of Muay Thai practitioners

References

1956 births
Living people
Posai Sitiboonlert
Posai Sitiboonlert